Manningford Halt is a former railway station which opened in 1932 in Manningford parish, Wiltshire, England on the Berks and Hants Extension Railway between  and . The halt closed in 1966 when local services were withdrawn.

The halt was about half a mile north of both Manningford Abbots and Manningford Bruce, west of the bridge carrying the Wilcot road over the railway, which had opened in 1862. The two platforms each had a small corrugated iron shelter.

The station was demolished after closure leaving no trace of its existence. The track remains open as part of the Reading–Taunton line.

References

External links
 Class 52 No. D1051 'Western Ambassador' on the 0955 Paignton to Paddington service at Manningford Halt 20 July 1972

 

Disused railway stations in Wiltshire
Former Great Western Railway stations
Railway stations in Great Britain opened in 1932
Railway stations in Great Britain closed in 1966
1932 establishments in England
Beeching closures in England